Red Star Medal may refer to:
 , military decoration of the People's Liberation Army
 Red Star Medal (Azerbaijan), Qizil Ulduz Medal